The Faculty of Political Science in Sarajevo or FPN is one of the 24 faculties of University of Sarajevo. The faculty was formed in 1961 as former "High School of Political Science in Sarajevo" and it is located in urban area of Sarajevo (between Drvenija Bridge and Čobanija Bridge). Faculty actively participates in the Bologna Process in Bosnia and Herzegovina, publishes scholarly papers, review articles, research notes and book reviews covering major areas of political sciences, sociology, security studies, social work, and media studies. Sarajevo Social Science Review has been published by the Faculty of Political Sciences Sarajevo (formerly Godišnjak Fakulteta političkih nauka - Annual Papers of Faculty of Political Sciences). There is also FPN student newspapers called SPONA.

Organization
The Faculty of Political Science in Sarajevo has five departments and one institute:
Department of Politology
Department of Sociology
Department of Communication studies (Journalism)
Department of Social work
Department of Security and Peace studies
Institute of Social Research

Degree programs
Educational process at the Faculty of Political Sciences is carried out in three cycles of study:
The Bachelor's program (BA) lasts three years carrying 180 ECTS credits
The Master's program (MA) lasts two years carrying 120 ECTS credits
The Doctoral program (PhD) lasts three years carrying 180 ECTS credits

References

External links
Official website
Official website of University in Sarajevo

University of Sarajevo
Education in Bosnia and Herzegovina
Political science in Bosnia and Herzegovina
Political science education
1961 establishments in Yugoslavia